David Pisonero Nieto (born 10 April 1973) is a former Spanish professional handball player. He developed his career in the pivot position. He is currently an assistant coach in RK Vardar.

Career

David Pisonero developed his career as a player from 1990 to 2003. From 2017 he retired and continued as a coach.

As a player 
 BM Valladolid: 1990–1995
 CB Cantabria: 1995–1997
 CB Ademar León: 1997–1998
 BM Valladolid: 1998–2003

As a coach 
 Recoletas Atlético Valladolid: 2017–2019
 RK Vardar: 2019
 RK Vardar (assistant): 2019
 Recoletas Atlético Valladolid: 2020–

Honors

 Copa ASOBAL (2): 1996, 2002
 IHF Super Globe  (1): 1996

References

External links
 BM Valladolid profile
 RK Vardar profile

1973 births
Living people
Spanish male handball players
Liga ASOBAL players
Sportspeople from Valladolid
CB Ademar León players
BM Valladolid players
20th-century Spanish people
21st-century Spanish people